Boomerang was a German pay television channel operated by Warner Bros. Discovery under its International division. It was launched on 1 June 2006, the channel primarily airs animated programming.

Broadcasting
In August 2013, SES Platform Services (later MX1, now part of SES Video) won an international tender by Turner Broadcasting System, to provide playout services for Boomerang, and for Cartoon Network, TNT Glitz, TNT Film and TNT Serie (in both SD and HD) for the German-speaking market, digitization of existing Turner content, and playout for Turner on-demand and catch-up services in Germany, Austria, Switzerland the Benelux region, from November 2013.

On 1 October 2018, Boomerang Germany shut down and was replaced with Boomerang CEE.

Logos

References

External links
 Official Site

Boomerang (TV network)
Turner Broadcasting System Germany
Television stations in Germany
Television stations in Austria
Television stations in Switzerland
German-language television stations
Television channels and stations established in 2006
Television channels and stations disestablished in 2018
Children's television networks